Dragon Fighter is a Sci Fi Pictures original film that premiered on January 4, 2003 and was directed by Phillip J. Roth. It stars Dean Cain and Kristine Byers.

Plot

In Southern England in the Middle Ages, six knights ride in horses towards a destroyed town. They see the remains of burned buildings and dead people until they come upon a mother and her dead baby. She quickly dies, and then a rhino-sized dragon flies overhead, and the knights follow right behind, vowing to kill the creature. The six knights arrive at the dragon's lair, where they see skeletons of horses and people. Suddenly the dragon surprises them by shooting fireballs at them. The knights divide up into loose groups, carrying barrels of gunpowder and hide; then two knights appear and fire flaming arrows at the dragon, but they miss, and the dragon torches one of the knights with its fire breath. The other knights then attack, but the dragon dodges their arrows and shoots a fireball at the gunpowder barrels, which causes them to explode. The explosion causes a cave-in that traps the dragon and the knights inside, with only one knight managing to escape.
    
One thousand years later, in the nearby desert of California, Captain David Carver transports Dr. Ian Drakovitch, carrying a suitcase, to an ultra-secret underground research facility, where scientists specialize in cloning endangered or extinct animals. David asks if there are top-secret items in the briefcase, which surprises Dr. Drakovitch, but he admits that David is correct. The helicopter, which the men are riding in, develops fuel problems, but David safely manages to land the craft.

He is then led into the facility, where he becomes the new security officer. Captain Sergei Petrov (a Russian security officer) introduces him to the other people, including Dr. Meredith Winter, Dr. Greg Travis, Kevin Korisch, and Bailey Kent. He also meets Cookie (a deaf man and the facility's cook). After finding his room, David heads into the meeting room where Dr. Ian discusses what he uncovered in a cave in Southern England. He says that he collected the remains of a strange "winged dinosaur" and that they were found alongside human remains and are over 1,000 years old. The other people do not believe this, saying that the remains are too young, but David suggests that the remains are those of a dragon. This idea agitates Dr. Drakovitch, but the other guys laugh at this possibility. David heads outside to try to fix the helicopter but is coaxed by Dr. Winter to head inside to see the cloning process. Dr. Ian then orders the fossil samples to be cloned by two unnamed scientists in hazmat suits inside a cloning chamber and says that the whole animal should reform within 24 hours.

However, to everyone's surprise, the cloning process is completed within three hours, much shorter than initially planned. This worries David, and he tells Greg to get him some weapons, but there are only shotguns and pistols with both regular and tranquilizer shots. Dr. Ian sends the two scientists into the cloning chamber to retrieve the specimen, but an explosion blows the whole room apart. David gets worried and tries to go in but is blocked by Dr. Ian, who tells him not to go in there so that he does not contaminate the specimen. David orders him to get out of the way and open the door, or he will shoot the hell out of him. This works, and when they go in, they find the whole room destroyed and that the creature blew a hole in the back of the room leading into an underground basement. Dr. Ian orders the beast to be subdued, not killed and both David and Greg head into the cellar, directed by Dr. Winter from inside the lab. They later find the consumed bodies of the two scientists.
   
Suddenly Winter picks up something big heading towards the men on her radar, but it interferes with the radar. Greg and David get separated, and now the thing on the radar heads for Greg. Suddenly Greg is ambushed and killed by the dragon. David heads for his rescue but is too late and instead finds the dragon eating Greg. David loads his shotgun with the regular shots and fires at the dragon, but its skin is too tough and barely affects it. This makes it mad, and the dragon breathes fire at David, who quickly dodges it and runs away with the winged reptile in hot pursuit. He heads back into the lab and is almost fried by the dragon, he then orders the others to open the door, but Ian refuses. Capt Sergei orders the scientist to open the door, or he will shoot him; he finally does and lets David in. Both he and Sergei then head into the hallways to reach the elevator so they can all escape, but the back hallway explodes, killing Sergei.

The dragon blasts its way out from the basement, and David runs back into the lab. Dr. Winter then says that the dragon blasted the entire system, causing an automatic lockdown and trapping them. Bailey tells everybody that the dragon is getting hungry and that it will wander around to search for food and a nest. It is also warm-blooded (much like the dinosaurs), and it needs to keep itself cool, so the scientists have to revert the cooling system to a different spot in the facility to lure the dragon away from the elevator. To do this, they need a laptop in Kevin's room, so David orders Kevin to come with him because he is the only one who can open it. At first, Kevin refuses to go but agrees to go after being threatened by David. They finally make it into his room, but Kevin insists that he wants to stay. David leaves him, grabs the laptop, and heads out. Kevin plays some music, which attracts the dragon towards David, who shoots at it and barely escapes back through a vent. The dragon then slams the side of Kevin's room; he gets angry and opens the door but sees nothing. He then hears something outside again and hits the door switch with a baseball bat. He finds the dragon there, which quickly kills and eats him.

David heads back into the lab with the laptop, but it is slightly damaged. They download the information needed access the elevator into the main computer. Dr. Ian goes mad and starts shooting the mainframe, screwing it up even more. Also, the damaged mainframe activates a self-destruct system, which will cause the entire facility to explode in minutes. David then has to head back into the vent to reach a storage box so he can reboot the elevator's system manually (he also finds out that Cookie is not deaf but pretended to be so he could get a job), but the dragon comes back and attacks him with its fire breath. David manages to escape, heads for the storage box, and successfully reboots the system but is then ambushed again by the dragon. David fires a couple of shots at the dragon and heads into Dr. Ian's room, where he discovers evidence that the doctor had known that the fossil was a dragon all this time and he finds pictures, books of dragons, and a sword. David heads back to the lab and gets the remaining people to run for the elevator before the entire base explodes.

They head into the elevator but the dragon heads back and fries the elevator's wires with its fire breath, preventing it from moving up. The survivors have to climb out from inside the elevator, but the dragon rams itself into the door. David throws Bailey a pistol, which she then uses to attack the dragon but has no effect on the creature. Bailey runs out of bullets and asks David for some more, but the elevator's door opens up, and the dragon quickly breathes fire into the elevator, killing both Bailey and Cookie. Dr. Ian, David, Dr. Winter, and her pet cloned dog head outside and start up the helicopter just before the whole facility explodes. However, the dragon manages to escape by squeezing through the elevator vent, and flies after the helicopter. The dragon then attacks the helicopter by slamming into it and breathing fire at it, David tries to shake off the dragon, but it keeps coming. He calls for backup at a nearby military base, and Dr. Ian opens the helicopter's side door to take some pictures of the dragon, but it comes near and knocks him out of the helicopter, causing him to fall to his death.    
  
Finally, five F-16 Fighting Falcons come to the rescue, but they cannot lock on the dragon because it is too cold for their heat-seeking missiles, so instead, they repeatedly try to ram into it. The dragon gets mad, turns around, and fires a fireball at one jetplane, blowing it apart and causing it to slam into another jetplane, destroying them both. The dragon keeps following the helicopter in hot pursuit, and the craft is about to malfunction, thanks to its earlier problems. David figures that it is heading for the nearby city and that they got to keep it away from there. He orders the F-16s to fire a missile anyway, but it misses the dragon. David then has an idea and tells Dr. Winter to take control of the helicopter. He opens up the fuel hatch and dumps half the fuel on the dragon, then fires a flare gun at it, causing it to burst into flames. With a target hot enough to fire upon, the jets fire a missile at the dragon, killing it. David's helicopter begins to fall to the ground, and after a rough landing, David, Winter, and the cloned dog make it out alright.

Back at the destroyed facility, two soldiers head in to investigate and retrieve anything from the explosion. They discover a second lab under the first one and a cloning chamber housing a dragon embryo that quickly grows in size, breaks out of the chamber, and kills the two soldiers.

Cast

Bio Dragon
While there is no official name some fans refer to the monster as Bio Dragon; another name occasionally used to refer the creature is the "Genetic Dragon".
The monster was roughly 30 feet (about half that was its long counterbalancing tail) long, 6 feet tall when moving at speed, and nearly double that when fully erect as if to breathe fire or otherwise. It moved in a traditional theropodian stance with its long, dexterous arms folded and held near, but not to, its chest; the wings stayed tight to its back when not in use. The dragon had the typical horns and spines of dragonkind, but were not too elaborate in design or size. The dragon was a stony grey-black color. It was obviously carnivorous and, as stated in the film, warm-blooded. Its endothermic nature combined with breathing out fire was its only serious fault because it needed to stay in cooler areas to keep from suffering from heat stroke or exhaustion, so it kept near the air conditioning vents in the facility. This would also explain why the reptile was living in England in the Middle Ages, a relatively cold place. Like any other dragon, it can breathe a napalm-like stream of fire, fly/glide and condense the flames into somewhat explosive fireballs with the added addition of having tightly interlocked armored scales that is sturdy enough to withstand many bullet shots, even a shotgun could not breach the scaly skin of the flying reptile. It could, however, be destroyed by ordinary missiles from fighter jets like any real animal. Sound effects included some unique hisses and snarls, along with the generic monster effects used in many films of the genre.

Cast
 Dean Cain as Captain David Carver
 Kristine Byers as Dr. Meredith Winter
 Robert Zachar as Dr. Ian Drackovitch
 Marcus Aurelius as Dr. Greg Travis
 Robert DiTillio as Kevin Korisch
 Vassela Dimitrova as Bailey Kent
 Hristo Shopov as Captain Sergei Petrov
 Chuck Eckert as 'Cookie'

External links
 http://www.scifi.com/onair/scifipictures/dragonfighter/
 http://imdb.com/title/tt0312640/
 https://web.archive.org/web/20060905232920/http://www.beyondhollywood.com/reviews/dragonfighter.htm

2003 television films
2003 films
Films about dragons
Bulgarian speculative fiction films
Syfy original films
Films directed by Phillip J. Roth
2000s American films